Margaret Samu is an art historian who specializes in the art and design of 18th- and 19th-century Russia. She teaches at The New School's Parsons School of Design and lectures at the Metropolitan Museum of Art in New York. She previously worked in the Russian and Slavic Studies Department at New York University, Stern College for Women, and in the City University of New York system.

Samu is an active member of the Society of Historians of East European, Eurasian, and Russian Art and Architecture , which she served as president from 2013 until 2015. She is a member of the Organizing Committee of the 19v Working Group on Nineteenth-Century Russian Culture, Literature, and the Arts, and co-organizes the 19v Art History Seminar.

Samu is a specialist in Russian art. In 2016 she was awarded the Mary Zirin Prize by the Association for Women In Slavic Studies.

Selected publications
 “Karl Briullov’s Last Day of Pompeii at the Paris Salon of 1834.” The Art Bulletin 103, no. 2 (June 2021). 77–103. DOI: 10.1080/00043079.2021.1847579
 “Exhibiting Westernization: Aleksei Venetsianov’s Nudes and the Russian Art Market 1820-1850.” Nineteenth-Century Studies 25 (2015). 131–147.
 “ ‘Serving Art…’ Artist and Model in the Nineteenth-Century Russia Art World.” Iskusstvoznanie. “ ‘Служа искусству…’ Художник и модель в русской художественной культуре XIX века.” Искусствознание] 3-4 (Autumn 2014). 434–447. 
 From Realism to the Silver Age: New Studies in Russian Artistic Culture. DeKalb: Northern Illinois University Press, 2014 (co-editor and contributor).
 “Evelyn Beatrice Longman: Establishing a Career in Public Sculpture.” Woman's Art Journal 25, no. 2 (Fall 2004/Winter 2005). 8–15.

References

External links

Living people
Year of birth missing (living people)
Women art historians
New York University alumni
People associated with the Metropolitan Museum of Art
Independent scholars
Wellesley College alumni
Historians of Russian art